Aspergillus botucatensis (also known as Neosartorya spinosa) is a species of fungus in the genus Aspergillus. It is from the Fumigati section. The species was first described in 1995. It has been reported to produce aszonalenins, 2-pyrovoylaminobenzamide, and pseurotin.

Growth and morphology

A. botucatensis has been cultivated on both Czapek yeast extract agar (CYA) plates and Malt Extract Agar Oxoid® (MEAOX) plates. The growth morphology of the colonies can be seen in the pictures below.

References 

botucatensis
Fungi described in 1995